Baldons is a joint parish council area covering the civil parishes of Toot Baldon and Marsh Baldon, in the South Oxfordshire district about  southeast of Oxford, Oxfordshire. It was created in 2012, merging the  previously separate parish councils for the two parishes.

References

South Oxfordshire District